Euparyphus cataractus is a species of soldier fly in the family Stratiomyidae.

Distribution
United States.

References

Stratiomyidae
Insects described in 1973
Diptera of North America